BlackRock Smaller Companies Trust is a large British investment trust dedicated to smaller company investments. Established as the North British Canadian Investment Company in 1906, the company is a constituent of the FTSE 250 Index. The chairman is Nicholas Fry. The fund is managed by BlackRock.

References

External links
  Official site

Financial services companies established in 1906
Investment trusts of the United Kingdom
Companies listed on the London Stock Exchange
British companies established in 1906